Hippeastrum is a genus of about 90 species and over 600 hybrids and cultivars of perennial herbaceous bulbous plants. They generally have large fleshy bulbs and tall broad leaves, generally evergreen, and large red or purple flowers.

Hippeastrum is a genus in the family Amaryllidaceae (subfamily Amaryllidoideae, tribe Hippeastreae, and subtribe Hippeastrineae). For many years there was confusion among botanists over the generic names Amaryllis and Hippeastrum, one result of which is that the common name amaryllis is mainly used for cultivars of this genus, often sold as indoor flowering bulbs particularly at Christmas in the northern hemisphere. By contrast the generic name Amaryllis applies to bulbs from South Africa, usually grown outdoors. The genus is native to tropical and subtropical regions of the Americas from Argentina north to Mexico and the Caribbean.

Description 

Most Hippeastrum bulbs are tunicate (a protective dry outer layer and fleshy concentric inner scales or leaf bases). The bulbs are generally between 5–12 cm (2"–5") in diameter and produce two to seven long-lasting evergreen or deciduous leaves that are 30–90 cm (12"–36") long and 2.5–5 cm (1"–2") wide. The leaves are hysteranthous (develop after flowering), sessile (borne directly from the stem or peduncle), rarely persistent and subpetiolate.

The flowers are arranged in umbelliform inflorescences which are pauciflor or pluriflor (2-14 flowers), supported on an erect hollow scape (flower stem) which is 20–75 cm (12"–30") tall and 2.5–5 cm (1"–2") in diameter with two free bracts forming a spathe which is bivalve with free leaflets at its base.
Depending on the species, there are two to fifteen large showy flowers, which are more or less zygomorphic and hermaphrodite. Each flower is 13–20 cm (5"–8") across, and the native species are usually purple or red. They are funnelform (funnel shaped) and declinate (curving downwards and then upwards at the tip) in shape. The perianth has six brightly colored tepals (three outer sepals and three inner petals) that may be similar in appearance or very different. The perianth segments are subequal or unequal. The tepals are united at the base to form a short tube, usually with a rudimentary scaly paraperigonium with fimbriae or a callose ridge present at the throat.

The androecium consists of six stamens with filiform (thread like) filaments, which are fasciculate (in close bundles) and declinate or ascendent. The anthers are dorsifixed or versatile. In the gynaecium, the ovary is inferior and trilocular with pluriovulate locules. The style is filiform, and the stigma trifid. The fruit forms a trivalve capsule containing seeds which are dry, flattened, obliquely winged or irregularly discoid, hardly ever turgid, and globose (spherical) or subglobose, with a brown or black phytomelanous testa.

Etymology 
The name Hippeastrum was first given to the genus by Herbert, being derived from the Ancient Greek, meaning a "knight's star" from ἱππεύς (hippeus, mounted knight) and ἄστρον (astron, star), to describe the first recognized species, Hippeastrum reginae. Herbert proposed to call the genus, which he distinguished from Linnaeus' Amaryllis, Hippeastrum, or "knight's-star-lily". He states; "I have named [them] Hippeastrum or Knights-star-lily, pursuing the idea which gave rise to the name Equestris" (p.12).

Herbert's fourteen species included this Hippeastrum equestre. This 'equine' connection refers to Carl Linnaeus the Younger who had named (in an unpublished manuscript) a West Indian species as Amaryllis equestris, because of its similarity to the African genus Amaryllis. This name and attribution was first published by William Aiton in 1789, in his Hortus Kewensis. Which species this was is not known precisely. However, in 1795 William Curtis, described Amaryllis equestris or the Barbados lily in his Botanical Magazine, referring to Aiton:
 
"The spatha is composed of two leaves, which standing up at a certain period of the plant's flowering like ears, give to the whole flower a fancied resemblance of a horse's head; whether LINNÆUS derived his name of equestris from this circumstance or not, he does not condescend to inform us."

In 1803 John Sims claimed Curtis had made a mistake in this attribution, and that; "this name was given from the remarkable likeness the front view of it has to a star of some of the orders of knight-hood; an appearance well expressed by JACQUIN's figure in the Hortus Schoenbrunnensis"

Despite much speculation, there is no definitive explanation of either Linnaeus fils or Herbert's thinking. For instance the 'knight's star' has been compared to Linnaeus' decoration as a Knight of the Order of the Polar Star. The Latin word equestris (of a knight, or horseman) may have been confused with equi (of a horse), or possibly Herbert was making a literary knight's move on the Linnaean term. The flower name has even been compared to the mediaeval weapon, the spoked mace or Morning Star which it superficially resembles.

Common name

Although the 1987 decision settled the question of the scientific name of the genus, the common name "amaryllis" continues to be used. Bulbs sold as amaryllis and described as ready to bloom for the holidays belong to the genus Hippeastrum. "Amaryllis" is also used in the name of some societies devoted to the genus Hippeastrum. Separate common names are used to describe the genus Amaryllis, e.g., "Naked Lady".

Taxonomy

Separation of Hippeastrum from Amaryllis 
The taxonomy of the genus is complicated. The first issue is whether the name should more properly be Amaryllis L.. In 1753 Carl Linnaeus created the name Amaryllis belladonna, the type species of the genus Amaryllis, in his Species Plantarum along with eight other Amaryllis species. Linnaeus had earlier worked on the Estate of George Clifford near Haarlem between 1735 and 1737 describing the plants growing there in his Hortus Cliffortianus in 1738. It is to this work that he refers in his Species Plantarum. This was assumed to be the South African Cape Belladonna, although not precisely known. Clifford's herbarium is now preserved at the Natural History Museum in London.

At the time both South African and South American plants were placed in this same genus. By the early nineteenth century Amaryllis had become a polymorphic (diverse) genus with about 50 species from what we would consider a dozen genera today, and attempts were made to separate it into different genera. This work commenced in 1819 with the contributions of the English botanist, the Revd. William Herbert in Curtis's Botanical Magazine which he expanded in 1821 in The Botanical Register, identifying 14 species of the new genus of Hippeastrum, and only leaving three species in Amaryllis. The rest of the Amaryllis species he transferred to other genera, several of which he created. Herbert further refined his descriptions of Hippeastrum in his work on the Amaryllidaceae in 1837.

Nomenclature debate 
Since then a key question has been whether Linnaeus's original type was a South African plant (now Amaryllis) or a South American plant (now Hippeastrum). If the latter, the correct name for the genus Hippeastrum would then be Amaryllis and a new name would need to be found for the South African genus. In 1938 Johannes Cornelius Theodorus Uphof (JCT Uphof) claimed, with some evidence, that the plant was in fact the South American Hippeastrum equestre (Linn. fil.) Herb. (syn. Amaryllis equestris (Linn. fil.) ex Aiton, accepted name H. puniceum) a plant which Carl Linnaeus' son, Linnaeus the Younger (Linn. fil.) had described c. 1781-3 (unpublished) but soon after appearing in the Hortus Kewensis of 1789. This paper sparked a debate over the next half century, that delayed the official transfer of species from Amaryllis to Hippeastrum. This debate involved botanists on both sides of the Atlantic and the final outcome was a decision by the 14th International Botanical Congress in 1987 that Amaryllis L. should be a nomen conservandum (conserved name, i.e., correct regardless of priority) and ultimately based on a specimen of the South African Amaryllis belladonna from the Clifford Herbarium. Thus Amaryllis L. is the correct name for the South African genus, not the South American genus (Hippeastrum).

Claim for Leopoldia 
The second issue is whether the name should be Leopoldia. In 1819 Herbert had proposed Leopoldia as a nomen provisorium (provisional name) for the same taxon as he called Hippeastrum in 1821. Although Leopoldia was subsequently validated (i.e., became the correct name), this was overlooked, and Hippeastrum rather than Leopoldia was used for the genus of New World amaryllids. Following Filippo Parlatore in 1845, the name Leopoldia was used for a genus of grape hyacinth species, allied to Muscari. In order to preserve the widespread usage of both Hippeastrum and Leopoldia, Fabio Garbari and Werner Greuter proposed in 1970 that Herbert's Hippeastrum and Parlatore's Leopoldia should be conserved and Herbert's Leopoldia rejected. This was accepted and Hippeastrum Herb. is now a nomen conservandum (conserved name), i.e., the correct name regardless of the fact that it does not have priority over Leopoldia.

Intergeneric hybrids
While interspecific hybrids of Hippeastrum are relatively common, hybridization with other genera of Amaryllidaceae are more rare. The most conspicuous exception is the hybrid obtained through crossbreeding with the Mexican Sprekelia formosissima (St James's lily, Aztec lily, Jacobean lily), another member of the tribe Hippeastreae, originally called Amaryllis formosissima, which is apomictic. × Hippeastrelia is the name given to this cross.

Subgenera 
A number of subgenera have been proposed over the years. For instance in the 1870s and 1880s John Gilbert Baker considerably reorganised Hippeastrum. In 1878 he described nine sections of the genus, but by 1888 he included seven subgenera, namely (number of species in parentheses) Habranthus (10), Phycella (3), Rhodophiala (5), Macropododastrum (1), Omphalissa (6), Aschamia (10) and Lais (3), some of which have since been treated as separate genera (Habranthus, Rhodophiala). Baker both reduced the original number of species of Herbert, but also enlarged the genus by adding in other genera such as Habranthus, Phycella, Rhodophiala and Rhodolirion (also called Rhodolirium, and subsequently moved to Rhodophilia), which he included as separate sections of Hippeastrum. In addition, he included many new species being discovered in South America, particularly Chile. His 1878 classification included 47 species, reduced to 38 by 1888. These subgenera were not widely used due to indistinct boundaries of some of the divisions. For reference, these were:
 Aschamia (Salisb.) Baker (e.g. H. reginae, H. andreanum, H. scopulorum, H. mandonii, H. leopoldii, H. reticulatum, H. stylosum)
 Cephaleon Traub (e.g. H. machupijchense)
 Lais (Salisb.) Baker (e.g. H. striatum, H. vittatum, H. breviflorum)
 Macropodastrum Baker (e.g. H. elegans)
 Omphalissa (Salisb.) Baker (e.g. H. aulicum, H. psittacinum, H. calyptratum, H. cybister, H. pardinum, H. miniatum, H. iguazuanum)
 Sealyana Traub (e.g.: H. reticulatum)

Following a major recircumscription of Hippeastreae, Hippeastrum was once again formally divided into two subgenera, by the inclusion of the three species of Tocantina:
 Tocantinia (Ravenna) Nic.García (3)
 Hippeastrum (~100)

Selected species

, the World Checklist of Selected Plant Families accepts 91 species: Garcia et al (2019) estimate approximately 100 species in subgenus Hippeastrum, together with 3 in subgenus Tocantinia.

Hippeastrum angustifolium Pax
Hippeastrum arboricola (Ravenna) Meerow
Hippeastrum aulicum (Ker Gawl.) Herb.
Hippeastrum aviflorum (Ravenna) Dutilh
Hippeastrum calyptratum (Ker Gawl.) Herb.
Hippeastrum canterai Arechav.
Hippeastrum correiense (Bury) Worsley
Hippeastrum cybister (Herb.) Benth. ex Baker
Hippeastrum evansiae (Traub & I.S.Nelson) H.E.Moore
Hippeastrum ferreyrae (Traub) Gereau & Brako
Hippeastrum iguazuanum (Ravenna) T.R.Dudley & M.Williams
Hippeastrum leopoldii T.Moore
Hippeastrum miniatum (Ruiz & Pav.) Herb.
Hippeastrum papilio (Ravenna) Van Scheepen
Hippeastrum pardinum (Hook.f.) Dombrain
Hippeastrum petiolatum Pax
Hippeastrum psittacinum (Ker Gawl.) Herb.
Hippeastrum puniceum (Lam.) Voss. Syn. H. equestre (Aiton)
Hippeastrum reginae (L.) Herb. 
Hippeastrum striatum (Lam.) H.E.Moore syn. H. rutilum (Ker Gawl.) Herb.
Hippeastrum reticulatum (L'Hér.) Herb. syn. H. striatifolium (Sims)
Hippeastrum vittatum (L'Hér.) Herb.

Unplaced names include Hippeastrum ugentii, considered in the Kew World Checklist of Selected Plant Families as probably a Crinum.

Hybrids include Hippeastrum ×johnsonii.

Distribution and habitat 
Hippeastrum species are concentrated in two centres of diversity, the main one in Eastern Brazil and the other in the central southern Andes of Peru, Bolivia and Argentina, on the eastern slopes and nearby foothills. Some species are found as far north as Mexico and the West Indies. The genus is thought to have originated in Brazil where at least 34 of the species have been found. Their habitat is mainly tropical and subtropical, though those species found south of the equator, or at sufficient altitude may be considered temperate. Hippeastrum is found in a wide range of habitats. Many are found in underbrush, while others prefer full sun. Hippeastrum angustifolium is an example of a species preferring flood areas, while other species prefer a drier habitat. There are also epiphytic species such as Hippeastrum aulicum, Hippeastrum calyptratum, Hippeastrum papilio and Hippeastrum arboricola, which require air circulation around their roots, which are in the subgenus Omphalissa.

Ecology

Reproduction 
Species are generally diploid with 2n=22 chromosomes, but some species, such as Hippeastrum iguazuanum, have 24. The genus has a degree of interspecies intercompatibility allowing crossing.

Some species, such as the Uruguayan Hippeastrum petiolatum, are sterile and unable to produce seeds. H. petiolatum is a sterile triploid that reproduces asexually, producing many bulbils around the mother bulb. These are light, and easily carried on the surface of water ensuring distribution of the species during the rainy season. Other species such as Hippeastrum reticulatum are self-pollinating, reproducing by distributing seed. Although this does not guarantee genetic diversity in natural populations, it is widely used by colonising species. These two examples are not however typical of the genus, which commonly reproduces through allogamy. One mechanism that limits self-pollination is that of self-incompatibility by which seeds are only produced by pollination from other plants. Furthermore, the plant generally releases its pollen about two days before its stigma is receptive, making cross-pollination more likely. Pollinators include hummingbirds in subtropical areas, and moths.

Pests 
Hippeastrum species are used as food plants by the larvae of some Lepidoptera species including Spodoptera picta (crinum grub) as well as Pseudococcidae (mealybugs), large, and small narcissus bulb flies (Eumerus strigatus and E. funeralis), thrips, mites, aphids, snails and slugs. A fungal disease attacking Hippeastrum is Stagonospora curtisii (red blotch, red leaf spot or red fire). The leaves are also eaten by grasshoppers, and grasshoppers commonly plant egg pods in the ground near Hippeastrum bulbs, which erupt in the spring, covering the plant with nymphs.

Conservation 
The following species were considered threatened or vulnerable by degradation of their natural habitat, according to the International Union for Conservation of Nature (IUCN) Red List of Threatened Species in 1997.

 Hippeastrum arboricolum (Argentina) 
 Hippeastrum aviflorum (Argentina) 
 Hippeastrum canterai (Uruguay) 
 Hippeastrum ferreyrae (Peru) 
 Hippeastrum petiolatum (Argentina & Brazil)

Cultivation 

Hippeastrum cultivars and species can be grown inside in pots or outside in warmer climates (Hardiness 7B-11). Many will bloom year after year provided they are given a dormant period in a cool, dark place for two months without water or fertilizer although some bulbs will start growing before the two-month period is up.

The bulb is tender and should not be exposed to frost, but is otherwise easy to grow with large rewards for small efforts, especially those that bloom inside during the winter months. Note too, that Hippeastrum can also be grown in the ground in temperate areas. Bulbs are usually sold in fall for early winter bloom. Bare-root bulbs do best planted in a pot only slightly larger than the circumference of the bulb in well-drained, organic mix (such as sterilized potting soil plus coir fiber, or equal amounts of peat moss, sand and humus), with one third of the bulb visible above the surface of the soil and two thirds buried.

After planting, sprouting requires a warm place (about 20 °C). Bulbs need light watering until the leaves and buds emerge, and need to be situated in a well-lit, cool place and watered as needed to maintain moderate soil moisture. Overwatering will cause bulb and root rot. Plants may be fed with common fertilizers that contain iron and magnesium. Blooming takes place about two months after planting. The plant's leaves should continue to grow after the flowers have faded. Summering outdoors in four or five hours of direct sunlight, plus fertilizing lightly as the season progresses, will help develop buds for the next year.

Breeding and propagation 
Intense cultivation of a number of species, particularly from Brazil, Bolivia and Peru, has occurred because of the appearance and size of the flowers, resulting in many hybrids and cultivars.

History 
Hippeastrum breeding began in 1799 when Arthur Johnson, a watchmaker in Prescot, England, crossed Hippeastrum reginae with Hippeastrum vitattum, obtaining hybrids that were later given the name Hippeastrum × 'Johnsonii'  (Johnson's amaryllis, 'hardy amaryllis' or St. Joseph's lily). Johnson shared his work with the Liverpool Botanic Garden which was fortunate, since his greenhouse was destroyed in a fire. His hybrid was being cultivated in the US by the mid-nineteenth century. Many new hybrid lines followed as new species were sent to Europe from South America, the most important of which were Reginae and Leopoldii.

The Reginae strain hybrids were produced by Jan de Graaff and his two sons in the Netherlands in the mid 19th century by crossing Hippeastrum vitatum and Hippeastrum striatum with Hippeastrum psittacinum and some of the better hybrids available in Europe at the time. Some of the most successful hybrids were Graveana and Empress of India.

Leopoldii hybrids arose from the work of the British explorer and botanist Richard Pearce, an employee of James Veitch & Sons, a plant nursery. Pearce brought back specimens of Hippeastrum leopoldii and Hippeastrum pardinum from the Andes. These two species were notable for large flowers that were wide open and relatively symmetrical. Crossing these two species with the best of the Reginae strain produced a lineage of very large open flowered specimens, with up to 4-6 flowers on each scape. The Veitch nursery dominated the commercial development of Hippeastrum leopoldii and other varieties up to the early years of the twentieth century, the best of their hybrids setting the standard for modern commercial development.

The late 19th and early 20th century saw Amaryllis breeding develop in the United States, particularly in Texas, California, and Florida in conjunction with the USDA (1910–1939). The major US contribution came from the work of Henry Nehrling and Theodore Mead, whose hybrids crossed with Dutch stock have produced some modern hybrids, although not matching the European strains.

In 1946, two Dutch growers moved to South Africa and began cultivation there. Although most cultivars of Hippeastrum come from the Dutch and South African sources, bulbs are now being developed in the United States, Japan, Israel, India, Brazil and Australia. The double flowers from Japan are particularly beautiful. Nurseries may list Amaryllis bulbs as being 'Dutch', 'Israeli', 'Peruvian' etc., depending on the country of origin.

Most modern commercial hybrids are derived from the following species:
 H. vittatum 
 H. leopoldii 
 H. pardinum 
 H. reginae 
 H. puniceum 
 H. aulicum

Propagation 
Three main methods are used for propagating Hippeastrum: seeds, bulbils and 'twin scales'. More recently micropropagation in vitro has been used on a commercial scale.
 

Seeds
The seeds are contained in a thin darkbrown/black paper like fleche, that might easily blow away with some wind. Seed multiplication may be used for the development of new cultivars or to increase the yield of native species. Seeds are generally sown in early summer in seedbeds, and then transplanted to larger containers. They require warmth, frequent watering, and should not be given a dormant period. Seeds do not breed true. Plants obtained from seeds take about six years to bloom.

Bulbils
Home propagation is best performed by using offset bulbils. Commercially, only cultivars that produce at least three bulbils on the mother bulb are used for this form of propagation. Plants grown from this method take three to four years to bloom.

Twin scales
The most common commercial propagation method is referred to as 'twin scales'. This involves the division of the bulb into 12 sections and then separating each section into twin scales connected by the basal plate. The cuttings that are derived from these are grown in moist vermiculite in the dark till bulbils appear. More recently growing them in sunlight has been found to produce a better crop.

In vitro
The technique of plant tissue culture in vitro improves the propagation of Hippeastrum by decreasing the time required to reach the minimum size to start the reproductive cycle, using sections of bulbs grown in artificial media with the addition of plant hormones.

Fragrance 
Most modern cultivars lack any fragrance although 'Dancing Queen' represents an exception. Fragrance is genetically related to flower colour (white, or pastel shades) and is a recessive characteristic, so that when fragrant and non fragrant varieties are crossed, not all progeny will be fragrant, whereas two fragrant progenitors will produce an all fragrant progeny.

Flowering 

Hippeastrum hybrids and cultivars are valued for their large ornamental flowers, particularly for indoor cultivation during the northern hemisphere winter. The larger the bulb, the more flowers it will produce. The largest bulbs measure 14 to 16 inches (36 to 41 cm) in circumference and will produce three or more scapes (flower stems) with four or more blooms each. The commonest bulbs measure  to  inches (27 to 32 cm) with two scapes with four to six flowers each depending on the cultivar. Some bulbs put up two flower scapes at the same time; others may wait several weeks between blooms and sometimes the second scape will have only two or three flowers rather than the usual four. A bulb needs to produce large, healthy leaves in the summer growing season before it can send up a scape the following year. Bulbs are often described by the country of origin of the bulb producers, since they may have different characteristics, e.g. 'Dutch Amaryllis', 'South African Amarylllis'. Dutch bulbs usually produce flowers first, then, after they have finished blooming (hysteranthous), the plant will begin growing leaves. Bulbs from the South African growers usually put up a scape and leaves at the same time (synanthous).

Of the many hybrids, the best known are those producing flowers with red, pink, salmon, orange and white colors. Other flower colors include yellow and pale green with variations on these including multicoloring, with different colored mottling, stripes or edges on the petals. Some flowers have uniform colors or patterns on all six petals while others have more pronounced colors on the upper petals than on the lower ones.

Although many names are used to describe hybrids and cultivars, e.g. 'Large Flowering', 'Dutch', 'Royal Dutch', there are five types that are commonly sold;
 Single flower (large flowering)
 Double flower
 Miniature (dwarf, or small flowering)
 Trumpet
 Jumbo (mammoth)
'Trumpets', as the name suggests, have flared, tube-shaped flowers. Single, double, and miniature bulbs are the ones typically sold by nurseries and other stores for the holidays in December and for Valentine's Day and Easter.

Of the commercially available Hippeastrum species, sometimes sold as 'exotic' amaryllis, Hippeastrum cybister has extremely thin petals often described as spider-like. The miniature evergreen Hippeastrum papilio or "butterfly amaryllis" whose petals resemble a butterfly (papilio) has a unique color and pattern with broad rose-burgundy center stripes and striations of pale green on the upper petals and narrow stripes on the bottom three. It has been crossed with both cybister and single flower cultivars to produce hybrids with unusual striping.

Dormancy
Hippeastrum bulbs can be induced to rebloom yearly by mimicking the conditions in its natural environment (cool dry winters). When foliage starts to yellow, dormancy can be induced by withholding water and placing the plant in a cool  dark place for six to ten weeks or until buds start to show. Even when plants are thriving outdoors in temperate climates, dormancy can be induced by withholding watering and fertilising in the northern hemisphere autumn, and bringing indoors to a cool environment prior to the first frost. Leaves will usually wither during this period and a flower stem begin to emerge after eight to ten weeks.

Subsequent care is as for new bulbs, as described above. Best results are obtained by transplanting every three to four years.

Cultivars 

The cultivar 'Clown' (Double Galaxy Group) (white with red stripes) has received the Royal Horticultural Society's Award of Garden Merit.

Gallery

Uses 

Cultivars of Hippeastrum are popular indoor ornamental plants prized for their large brightly colored flowers (including red, pink, salmon, orange and white). As such they have a very important place in the floriculture trade for sale as cut flowers or potted plants. Although the market is dominated by the Netherlands, and South Africa, other areas of production include Israel, Japan and the United States (Florida). Brazil also produces 17 million Hippeastrum bulbs annually.

Hippeastrum has yielded at least 64 isoquinoline alkaloids, which include anti-parasitic (e.g. candimine) and psychopharmacological activity due to their high alkaloid content. One alkaloid isolated from Hippeastrum vittatum (montanine) has demonstrated antidepressant, anticonvulsant and anxiolytic properties. Hippeastrum puniceum may also have therapeutic properties as it has been used in folk medicine to treat swellings and wounds.

Symbolism 

A stylized flower of a Hippeastrum cultivar (under its common name of amaryllis) is used internationally as a symbol for organizations associated with Huntington's disease, a genetic degenerative disease of the nervous system. The widely used logo represents a double image of a head and shoulders as the flower of a growing and vibrant plant. The reduced size of the inner head and shoulders image symbolizes the diminution in a person caused by Huntington's disease. The leaves represent the protection, purpose, growth and development of the Huntington's community worldwide in its search for a cure and treatment.

See also 
 Glossary of botanical terms
 Glossary of plant morphology

Notes

References 

{{Reflist|30em|refs=

 
 
 
 <ref name=Kamenetsky>

Bibliography

Books

General 

 
  
 
 
 
 
 
 

 
 
 
 
  
 
 see also Hortus Veitchii, Messrs James Veitch and Sons

Historical sources (chronological) 

 
 
 
 
 
 
 
 
 
 
 
  Digital edition by the University and State Library Düsseldorf
 
  (4 vols.)

Specific

Articles and theses 

 
 
 
 
 
 
 
 
 
 
 
  For references to Hippeastrum, see pp. 7ff, 31–34; for detailed descriptions of Hippeastrum splendens, see pp. 52–53.

Gardening journals

Websites

Databases 

 
 
  (Search for Hippeastrum)

Organisations

Wikimedia links

External images 

 
 
 
 
 
 
 
 

 
Amaryllidaceae genera
Amaryllidoideae
Flora of Central America
Flora of South America
Garden plants of North America
Garden plants of South America